Her or His Majesty's Armed Vessel (HMAV) was a ship prefix formerly used for certain Royal Navy ships.

The HMAV prefix now means Her Majesty's Army Vessel.

References
 List of Acronyms Preceding the Name of a Ship 

History of the Royal Navy
Ship prefixes
Year of disestablishment missing